AudioGaming is a French company developing procedural audio tools dedicated to sound designers and video game developers. It was founded in 2009 by Amaury La Burthe, Damien Henry & Guilllaume Le Nost.

Audio tools 
Their first VST/RTAS/AU plugins "AudioWind" and "AudioRain" were released in June 2012. The wind sound synthesis plug-in AudioWind was successfully used for ambient sounds in Quentin Tarantino's Django Unchained.

Their next product "AudioMotors", more oriented toward re-recording engineers, is an audio plug-in dedicated to vehicle engine sound synthesis. It can be used in such applications as a car chase soundtrack creation.
Also aiming for post-production, another product was announced in April 2013, "AudioSteps". It includes a large footsteps library as well as manipulation tools to ease shaping them to the actual dubbed scene and/or to any sound design choices.

Sound design for video games 
The company also takes part in first-hand video game development: in a partnership with French editor Bulkypix and developer Dogbox, the game Journey to Hell was created and released in March 2013.

In October 2013, the French platform game Type:Rider was released, with its soundtrack entirely designed by AudioGaming.

References

Electronics companies established in 2009
Video game companies of France
Video game development companies
2009 establishments in France
Companies based in Paris